In Ireland Counties are divided into Civil Parishes and Parishes are further divided into townlands. The following is a list of parishes in County Londonderry, Northern Ireland:

 

A
Aghadowey, Aghanloo, Agivey, Arboe, Artrea

B
Ballinderry, Ballyaghran, Ballymoney, Ballynascreen, Ballyrashane, Ballyscullion, Ballywillin, Balteagh, Banagher, Bovevagh

C
Carrick, Clondermot, Coleraine, Cumber Lower, Cumber Upper

D
Derryloran, Desertlyn, Desertmartin, Desertoghill, Drumachose, Dunboe, Dungiven

E
Errigal

F
Faughanvale, Formoyle

G
Grange of Scullion

K
Kilcronaghan, Kildollagh, Killelagh, Killowen, Kilrea

L
Learmount, LissanLavey

M
Macosquin, Maghera, Magherafelt, Magilligan or Tamlaghtard

T
Tamlaght, Tamlaght Finlagan, Tamlaght O'Crilly, Templemore, Termoneeny

See also
List of townlands in County Londonderry

References

 
Londonderry
Civil parishes